Dave Sheridan (June 7, 1943 – March 28, 1982) was an American cartoonist and underground comix artist. He was the creator of Dealer McDope and collaborated with Gilbert Shelton and Paul Mavrides on The Fabulous Furry Freak Brothers. As creative partner with fellow underground creator Fred Schrier, using the name "Overland Vegetable Stagecoach," they worked on Mother's Oats Funnies, published by Rip Off Press from 1970 to 1976.

Biography
Born in 1943 and raised in the Cleveland, Ohio area, Sheridan arrived in San Francisco, California in 1969 after having graduated from the Cleveland Institute of Art and serving time in the military in Ethiopia. In California, he collaborated with fellow midwesterner Fred Schrier as the "Overland Vegetable Stagecoach" on three issues of Mother's Oats Comix, two of Meef Comix, and a one-shot title called The Balloon Vendor,  published by Rip Off Press and The Print Mint.

Sheridan was the art editor for three issues of The Rip Off Review of Western Culture in 1972, a magazine published by the Rip Off Press. His solo comix work can be seen in Slow Death, Skull Comix, Hydrogen Bomb and Biochemical Warfare Funnies #1, San Francisco Comic Book #1, Tales from the Leather Nun, Rip Off Comix, and High Times, and in cartoons he made for the Berkeley Barb and Playboy. He also did the art for  Weed and Wine, the first mini-album produced by Cleveland area folk singer/songwriter John Bassette, as well as album covers for Carl Oglesby, John Lee Hooker, David Steinberg, and Impulse! Records.The "Black Death Malt Liquor" shirt regularly worn by Howard Hesseman on WKRP in Cincinnati in his role as Dr. Johnny Fever was designed and drawn by Sheridan. His illustrations appeared in Ramparts, and he produced a series of cannabis labels for the fictitious California Homegrowers Association (with cartoonist Pat Ryan).

Sheridan eventually settled in San Anselmo, California. There he became a member of the Artista collective, an artist collective with its own jackets and softball team. During the 1972 Major League Baseball strike, he appointed himself the head of the "Scab League", offering to have his team take the strikers' places for $100 per week and all the beer they could drink. He also befriended and worked closely with comedian Don Novello, drawing the album cover for Novello's Father Guido Sarducci Live at St. Douglas Convent comedy album. A characterization of Sarducci appeared in a Dealer McDope adventure, "20,000 Kilos Beneath the Sea" in Mother's Oats #3.

In 1974, Sheridan began collaborating on Gilbert Shelton's The Fabulous Furry Freak Brothers strips. These were syndicated by Rip Off Press to alternative and college weeklies nationwide, and later collected into comix and anthologies. His first issue of The Fabulous Furry Freak Brothers was #4, with a many-page story-arc entitled The Seventh Voyage of the Fabulous Furry Freak Brothers: escaping the landlady and her demands for rent, the hirsute trio go to Mexico where they encounter far worse perils, including a Carlos Castaneda parody. Sheridan's detailed graphic style lent itself well to the fantastic imagery needed to lampoon Castaneda's drug-related Central American-cum-New Age sorcery. He then continued to collaborate on the Freak Brothers comix series through issues 5, 6 and 7;  the team was joined by Paul Mavrides in 1978 for issue #6. In all, Sheridan contributed to 45 Freak Brothers tales.

Death
Sheridan was diagnosed with cancer on March 3, 1982, eight months after his July 4, 1981, marriage to Dava Stone. Sheridan died from a brain hemorrhage on March 28, 1982. He had been in a coma for four days at Mt. Zion Hospital in San Francisco. He was buried at sea at a memorial service the following Friday.

His wife Dava gave birth to their daughter Dori on April 4, 1982, a week after Sheridan died.

Biography
A full biography of Dave Sheridan, which reproduces most of his comix and graphics work, was published by Fantagraphics Books in 2018.

Bibliography

Overland Vegetable Stagecoach (with Fred Schrier) 
 Mother's Oats Comix #1 – San Francisco Comic Book Company/Rip Off Press 1969
 Mother's Oats Comix #2 – San Francisco Comic Book Company/Rip Off Press 1970
 Skull Comics #1 (with Greg Irons, Jack Jackson and Rory Hayes) – San Francisco Comic Book Company/Rip Off Press 1970
 The Balloon Vendor – San Francisco Comic Book Company/Rip Off Press 1971
 Meef Comix #1 – San Francisco Comic Book Company/Rip Off Press 1972
 Meef Comix #2 – San Francisco Comic Book Company/Rip Off Press 1973
 Tales of the Leather Nun #1 – Last Gasp Eco Funnies, 1973
 Mindwarp: An Anthology by Sheridan & Schrier — And/Or Press, 1975
 Mother's Oats Comix #3 – San Francisco Comic Book Company/Rip Off Press 1976

Other
 Slow Death Funnies #1 (with Fred Schrier, Jim Osborne and Gilbert Shelton) – Last Gasp 1970
 Slow Death Funnies #2 "The Sex Evulsors of Tecnicus" – Last Gasp 1970
 The Food Stamp Gourmet by William Brown, Illustrations by Greg Irons, Gilbert Shelton, and Dave Sheridan — Bellerophon Books, 1971.
 The Legion of Charlies by Tom Veitch, Greg Irons, and Dave Sheridan (Paperback) Last Gasp, 1971
  Light Comitragies – Greg Irons — Print Mint 1971
 Skull Comics No.s 2–5 – San Francisco Comic Book Company/Rip Off Press 1971–1972
 Yellow Dog #19 (with Fred Schrier) – The Print Mint 1971
 Fabulous Furry Freak Brothers issues 4, 5, 6 (with Paul Mavrides), and 7
 Jayzey Lynch's Nard n' Pat No. 1 "We Could Get Any Artist ta Draw Us!" (1974)
 U-Comix Sammelband Nr. 1 (Introduction to Paperback) UPN-Volksverlag (1974)
 U-Comix Sammelband Nr. 2 (Introduction to Paperback) UPN-Volksverlag (1975)
 The Seattle Simpleton (vol. 1 No. 3) "The Mellow Cab Man" (Freewheelin' Frank) and "The Story of Phineas and the Organic Mechanic", both by Shelton & Sheridan. Spring 1976.
 Adventures of Fat Freddy's Cat Books 1–3 – with Gilbert Shelton — Rip Off Press, 1977
 Thoroughly Ripped with the Fabulous Furry Freak Brothers and Fat Freddy's Cat! by Shelton and Sheridan — Rip Off Press, 1978
 Rip Off Comix No.s 3–9 Rip-Off Press 1978–1981
 The Best of High Times Comix, vol. 4 (1983) including Dr. McDope in Peru by Siegel & Sheridan, The Fabulous Furry Freak Brothers by Shelton & Sheridan, The Fabulous Furry Freak Brothers and the Mysterious Visitor by Shelton & Sheridan, and "Notorious Norbert" by Fleagle & Fosdick (AKA Shelton & Sheridan)
 Dealer McDope – Rip Off Press, 1985 (part of Underground Classics No. 2-3)
 Time Twisted Tales Rip Off Press, 1986
 The Collected Fat Freddy's Cat. Vol. 1 by Gilbert Shelton & Dave Sheridan — Rip Off Press, 1989.
 The Freak Brothers Bus Line and Other Tales by Gilbert Shelton, Paul Mavrides and Dave Sheridan — Rip Off Press, 1990
 The Collected Fat Freddy's Cat by Gilbert Shelton & Dave Sheridan — Rip Off Press (April 1990) , 
 The Fabulous Furry Freak Brothers Library by Gilbert Shelton, Dave Sheridan, and Paul Mavrides Rip Off Press, Incorporated (March 1995) , 
 Dave Sheridan: Life with Dealer McDope, The Leather Nun, and the Fabulous Furry Freak Brothers, Fantagraphics Underground, Mark Burstein (editor), 

Game
 Dealer McDope Dealing Game (Print Mint, 1971)Letter by T. Elton Snatchit, creator of Dealer McDope Dealing Game

Notes

References
 Michigan State University Library list of author's books

External links

 Sheridan obituary/tribute by Fred Schrier, Changeling Times'' #6 (ACE magazine)
 Dave Sheridan Art, a Facebook page devoted to the Dave Sheridan's art.

1943 births
1982 deaths
American cartoonists
Artists from Cleveland
The Fabulous Furry Freak Brothers
Psychedelic artists
Underground cartoonists